First Lady of Cape Verde is the title attributed to the wife of the president of Cape Verde. The position is currently vacant.

First ladies of Cape Verde

References

 
Cape Verde
Cape Verdean women in politics